Martin Clancy is an Irish musician and songwriter behind several bands including The Witness Protection Programme.

In the early 1980s Clancy formed Irish band In Tua Nua alongside Leslie Dowdall, Jack Dublin, Vinny Kilduff, Ivan O'Shea, Paul Byrne and Steve Wickham. After signing to U2's record label, Mother, in 1984 and producing several hits including a cover of Jefferson Airplane's "Somebody to Love", In Tua Nua officially disbanded in 1990.

Clancy embarked on a series of musical projects including acting as manager and producer of Jack Lukeman.

Clancy is Artist in Residence for the Seaport Music Festival and with Steve Dima, Clancy established Seaport Music Records.

References

External links 
 Martinclancy.eu

Irish folk musicians
Irish songwriters
Living people
Year of birth missing (living people)